The Londonderry City by-election was a Parliamentary by-election held on 30 January 1913. The constituency returned one Member of Parliament (MP) to the House of Commons of the United Kingdom, elected by the first past the post voting system.

Vacancy
The sitting Unionist MP, the James Hamilton succeeded his father on his death as the Duke of Abercorn, so vacated his seat in the House of Commons to take up his seat in the House of Lords. He had been MP here since 1900.

Previous result

Candidates
The Unionist candidate was 50-year-old Antrim born, London based soldier, Hercules Pakenham.

The Catholic clergy, whose authority on the choice of nationalist candidate was total, surprisingly selected Liberal David Hogg, a 73-year-old local shirt manufacturer and a Protestant.

Campaign
The date of poll was set at 30 January, just 27 days after the death of the old Duke. This left little time for campaigning.
Hogg's election address said he was a Liberal and a supporter of the government's Home Rule Bill; he did not canvass during the election.

Result

Aftermath
Hogg died in August 1914 causing another by-election at which the Liberal, Sir James Brown Dougherty was returned unopposed.

References

 Craig, F. W. S. (1974). British parliamentary election results 1885-1918 (1 ed.). London: Macmillan.
 Who's Who: www.ukwhoswho.com
 Debrett's House of Commons 1916

1913 elections in the United Kingdom
20th century in Derry (city)
By-elections to the Parliament of the United Kingdom in County Londonderry constituencies
Elections in Derry (city)
1913 elections in Ireland